The 1974 Temple Owls football team was an American football team that represented Temple University as an independent during the 1974 NCAA Division I football season. In its fifth season under head coach Wayne Hardin, the team compiled an 8–2 record and outscored opponents by a total of 335 to 142. The team played its home games at Temple Stadium (four games) and Veterans Stadium (two games) in Philadelphia. 

The team's statistical leaders included Steve Joachim with 1,950 passing yards, Henry Hynoski with 1,006 rushing yards, Pete Righi with 608 receiving yards, and Hynoski and Joachim with 54 points each.

Schedule

References

Temple
Temple Owls football seasons
Temple Owls football